Rinko Kawauchi HonFRPS (川内 倫子, Kawauchi Rinko, born 1972) is a Japanese photographer. Her work is characterized by a serene, poetic style, depicting the ordinary moments in life.

Life and work
Kawauchi became interested in photography while studying graphic design and photography at Seian University of Art and Design where she graduated in 1993. She first worked in commercial photography for an advertising agency for several years before embarking on a career as a fine art photographer. She has mentioned that she continues to work the advertising job. Her background and experience with design have influenced the edits and arrangements of photos in her series. Kawauchi often thinks about new ways to see her photographs, allowing her to continue to find new meaning and significance in her work. There is little known about her personal life and family, but through her photo book Cui Cui she portrays the memories of her family, which she has said to have been shooting for over a decade. The photos in said book captures all the ordinaries and emotions of life, ranging from the happiness of childbirth to the heartbreak of death.

At age 19, she began making prints of her first black-and-white photographs, and it wasn't until five years later that she started printing color photographs. After experimenting with different cameras, she decided to stay with the Rolleiflex, which she still uses.

In 2001, three of her photo books were published: Hanako (a Japanese girl's name), Utatane ("catnap"), and Hanabi ("fireworks"). In the following years she won prizes for two of the books in Japan. In 2004 Kawauchi published Aila; in 2010, Murmuration, and in 2011 Illuminance.

Kawauchi's art is rooted in Shinto, the ethnic religion of the people of Japan. According to Shinto, all things on earth have a spirit, hence no subject is too small or mundane for Kawauchi's work; she also photographs "small events glimpsed in passing," conveying a sense of the transient. Kawauchi sees her images as parts of series that allow the viewer to juxtapose images in the imagination, thereby making the photograph a work of art and allowing a whole to emerge at the end; she likes working in photo books because they allow the viewer to engage intimately with her images. Her photographs are mostly in 6×6 format. However, upon being invited to the Brighton Photo Biennial in 2010, Kawauchi first photographed digitally and began taking photos that were not square.

Kawauchi also composes haiku poems.

She lived for many years in Tokyo and in 2018 moved to the countryside on the outskirts of the city.

Style 
Since she began her photographic career, Kawauchi's photographs contained a unique aesthetic and mood, capturing intimate, poetic, and beautiful moments of the world around her. They often have brilliant and radiant light that give them a dream-like quality. The sublimity of her photographs are further enhanced by her use of soft colors as well as her awareness for the beauty in even the most average moments.

There is not one specific theme or concept that Kawauchi chooses to explore with her image creation; rather, she does it spontaneously, observing and reacting to everything that is around her before doing and sort of editing. She focuses on just shooting, photographing everything that attracts her eyes before looking back and thinking about why she was interesting in those subjects. Another subject that she explored in her book, Ametsuchi, was the practice of religious ceremonies and rituals that hinted at an earthly cycle involving the concepts of time and impermanence. In the book, she depicts Japan's Mount Aso, a sacred site for a Shinto ritual called yakihata, and its volcanic landscape. The ritual is a long-standing tradition dating back about 1,300 years in which farmland is burned yearly to maintain its sustainability for new crops as opposed to using chemicals, and the communities at Aso are among the few that continue this tradition. Ironically, witnessing essentially the rebirth of farmland take place, Kawauchi claims that she burned away her old self and was reborn herself.

In her book Halo, she continues to explore that theme with different rituals at other locations. She traveled to Izumo, Japan to witness a ritual that involves the lighting of sacred flames to welcome the gods. She also went to the Hebei province of China to see new year celebrations, including a 500 year old tradition of throwing molten iron at the city walls to make their own fireworks.

Awards

 2002 Kimura Ihei Award
 2009 Infinity Award for Art from the International Center of Photography 
 2012 Honorary Fellowship of the Royal Photographic Society 
 2013 Minister of Education Award for New Artists
 2013 Domestic Photographer Award, Higashikawa Prize, Higashikawa, Hokkaidō, Japan

Publications
 Hanako. 2001. 
Hanabi (Fireworks). 2001. Tokyo: Little More, 2002. .
 Utatane = siesta. Tokyo: Little More, 2001. .
Reprinted edition. Tokyo: Little More, 2020.
blue. 2003. .
 AILA. 2005. .
 the eyes, the ears. 2005. .
 Cui Cui. 2005. .
Rinko Diary. 2006. .
 Rinko Diary II. 2006. .
Majun. 2007. .
Semear. 2007. .
 Murmuration. Brighton: Photoworks, 2010. .
 One Day - 10 Photographers, Heidelberg/Berlin: Kehrer, 2010. , edited by Harvey Benge.
SNOWFLAKE TWELFTH. 2011.
 Illuminance. New York: Aperture, 2011. .
Light and Shadow. 2012. 
 Approaching Whiteness. Tokyo: Goliga, 2012.
Illuminance, Ametsuchi, Seeing Shadows. 2012. .
SHEETS. 2013. .
 Ametsuchi. New York: Aperture, 2013. .
Kirakira. 2013. .
Gift. 2014. .
 Light and Shadow. Kanagawa, Japan : Super Labo,  2014
The river embraced me. 2016. .
 Halo. New York: Aperture, 2017. .
A New Day. 2018. .
When I Was Seven. Hehe, 2019. .
As It Is. Marseille, France: Chose Commune, 2020. . With text in English and French.
Des Oiseaux. Paris: Éditions Xavier Barral, 2021. .

Exhibitions

Solo exhibitions 
1998: Utatane, Guardian Garden, Tokyo.
2006: Rinko Kawauchi, The Photographers' Gallery, London.
2007: Semear, Museu de Arte Moderna de São Paulo, São Paulo.
2010: Brighton Museum & Art Gallery, during Brighton Photo Biennial, New Documents, curated by Martin Parr, Brighton, UK.
2011: Illuminance, Foil Gallery, Tokyo.
2012: Light and Shadow, Traumaris Photography Space, Tokyo.
2012: Illuminance, Ametsuchi, Seeing Shadow, Tokyo Metropolitan Museum of Photography, Tokyo.
2013: Illuminance, Christophe Guye Galerie, Zurich.
2013: Ametsuchi, Aperture Gallery, New York.
2014: Ametsuchi, Galerie Priska Pasquer, Cologne.
2014: New Pictures 9: Rinko Kawauchi, Minneapolis Institute of Arts, Minneapolis.
2014: Ametsuchi, Main Gallery, Lesley University College of Art and Design.　
2014: Light and Shadow, Colissimo, Hyogo.
2015: Illuminance, KunstHausWien, Vienna, 20 March – 5 July 2015.
2017: Halo, Christophe Guye Galerie, Zurich.

Group exhibitions 
2005: Autumn 2005, Huis Marseille, Museum for Photography, Netherlands, 10 September – 4 December 2005
2008: Creatures from the Collection and Other Themes, Huis Marseille, Museum for Photography, Netherlands, 31 May – 31 August 2008
2010: Summer Loves, Huis Marselle, Museum for Photography, Netherlands, 5 June – 29 August 2010
2011: Bye Bye Kitty!!! Between Heaven and Hell in Contemporary Japanese Art, curated by David Elliott, Japan Society, New York. With Kawauchi and Makoto Aida (会田誠), Manabu Ikeda (池田学), Tomoko Kashiki (樫木知子), Haruka Kojin (荒神明香), Kumi Machida (町田久美), Yoshitomo Nara (奈良美智), Kohei Nawa (名和晃平), Motohiko Odani (小谷元彦), Hiraki Sawa (さわひらき), Chiharu Shiota (塩田千春), Tomoko Shioyasu (塩保朋子), Hisashi Tenmyouya (天明屋尚), Yamaguchi Akira (山口晃), Miwa Yanagi (やなぎみわ) and Tomoko Yoneda (米田知子).
2015: In the Wake: Japanese Photographers Respond to 3/11, Museum of Fine Arts, Boston, MA, 5 April – 12 July 2015.
2018: A Beautiful Moment, Huis Marseille, Museum for Photography, Netherlands, 9 June – 2 September 2018.

Collections 
Kawauchi's work is held in the following collections:

 San Francisco Museum of Modern Art, San Francisco: 7 works.
 Huis Marseille, Museum for Photography, Amsterdam
 Tokyo Metropolitan Museum of Photography, Tokyo

See also 
 Lieko Shiga, one of Kawauchi's contemporaries

Notes

References

External links

1972 births
Living people
Japanese photographers
Japanese women photographers
Fine art photographers
Fellows of the Royal Photographic Society